Kumari Meche (Nepali: कुमारी मेचे) is a Nepali communist politician and a member of the House of Representatives of the federal parliament of Nepal. She was elected from CPN UML under the proportional representation system filling the reserved seat for women and indigenous groups. She represents Nepal Communist Party (NCP), the new party formed by the merger of CPN UML with CPN (Maoist Centre), in the parliament. She is a member of the House Women and Social Committee.

References

Living people
Communist Party of Nepal (Unified Marxist–Leninist) politicians
Place of birth missing (living people)
Nepal Communist Party (NCP) politicians
21st-century Nepalese women politicians
21st-century Nepalese politicians
Nepal MPs 2017–2022
1964 births